The 1991–92 season was the 93rd season of competitive league football in the history of English football club Wolverhampton Wanderers. They played in the second tier of the English football system, the Football League Second Division, in the final season before the introduction of the Premier League.

The team finished in 11th place, having occupied a mid-table position for the majority of the campaign. During the season Steve Bull became the club's all-time leading goalscorer when he surpassed John Richards' total of 194 goals.

Results

Football League Second Division

A total of 24 teams competed in the Football League Second Division in the 1991–92 season. Each team played every other team twice: once at their stadium, and once at the opposition's. Three points were awarded to teams for each win, one point per draw, and none for defeats.

Final table

Source: Statto.com

Results summary

Results by round

FA Cup

League Cup

Full Members Cup

Players

|-
|align="left"|||align="left"|  ¤
|0||0||0||0||0||0||0||0||0||0||0||0||
|-
|align="left"|||align="left"| 
|0||0||0||0||0||0||0||0||0||0||0||0||
|-
|align="left"|||align="left"| 
|46||0||1||0||3||0||1||0||51||0||0||0||
|-
|align="left"|||align="left"| 
|44||1||1||0||3||0||1||0||49||1||0||0||
|-
|align="left"|||align="left"|  ¤
|||0||0||0||1||0||1||0||||0||0||0||
|-
|align="left"|||align="left"|  †
|||0||0||0||0||0||0||0||||0||0||0||
|-
|align="left"|||align="left"| 
|0||0||0||0||0||0||0||0||0||0||0||0||
|-
|align="left"|||align="left"| 
|||2||1||0||3||0||1||0||style="background:#98FB98"|||2||0||1||
|-
|align="left"|||style="background:#faecc8" align="left"|  ‡
|28||1||0||0||0||0||0||0||style="background:#98FB98"|28||1||0||1||
|-
|align="left"|||align="left"| 
|0||0||0||0||0||0||0||0||0||0||0||0||
|-
|align="left"|||align="left"| 
|0||0||0||0||0||0||0||0||0||0||0||0||
|-
|align="left"|||align="left"| 
|||0||1||0||1||0||0||0||||0||0||0||
|-
|align="left"|||align="left"| 
|46||1||1||0||3||0||1||0||51||1||0||0||
|-
|align="left"|||align="left"| 
|0||0||0||0||0||0||0||0||0||0||0||0||
|-
|align="left"|||align="left"| 
|||2||1||0||3||0||1||0||||2||0||0||
|-
|align="left"|||align="left"| 
|||8||1||0||3||2||1||0||||10||0||0||
|-
|align="left"|||align="left"| 
|||2||1||0||1||1||||0||||3||0||0||
|-
|align="left"|||align="left"| 
|43||8||1||0||2||0||1||0||47||8||0||0||
|-
|align="left"|||align="left"| 
|||1||||0||1||0||1||0||||1||0||0||
|-
|align="left"|||align="left"| 
|||0||0||0||2||0||1||0||||0||0||0||
|-
|align="left"|||align="left"| 
|||0||0||0||0||0||0||0||style="background:#98FB98"|||0||0||0||
|-
|align="left"|||align="left"| 
|||1||0||0||0||0||0||0||style="background:#98FB98"|||1||0||0||
|-
|align="left"|||align="left"|  ¤
|||3||0||0||3||2||0||0||||5||0||0||
|-
|align="left"|||align="left"| 
|0||0||0||0||0||0||0||0||0||0||0||0||
|-
|align="left"|FW||align="left"| 
|0||0||0||0||1||0||0||0||style="background:#98FB98"|||0||0||0||
|-
|align="left"|FW||align="left"| 
|43||20||1||0||2||3||1||0||47||23||0||0||
|-
|align="left"|FW||style="background:#faecc8" align="left"|  ‡
|||0||0||0||0||0||0||0||||0||0||0||
|-
|align="left"|FW||align="left"|  ¤†
|||0||0||0||0||0||0||0||||0||0||0||
|-
|align="left"|FW||align="left"| 
|||10||1||0||1||0||0||0||||10||0||0||
|-
|align="left"|FW||align="left"|  ¤†
|||0||0||0||0||0||0||0||||0||0||0||
|-
|align="left"|FW||align="left"| 
|0||0||0||0||0||0||0||0||0||0||0||0||
|-
|align="left"|FW||align="left"|  ¤
|||0||0||0||0||0||0||0||||0||0||0||
|}
Source: Wolverhampton Wanderers: The Complete Record

Transfers

In

Out

Loans in

Loans out

Management and coaching staff

References

1991-92
Wolverhampton Wanderers